The Erection of Cottages Act 1588 was an Act of the Parliament of England that prohibited the construction—in most parts of England—of any dwelling that did not have at least  assigned to it out of the freehold or other heritable land belonging to the person responsible for its construction.

Background

In the reign of Elizabeth I of England there arose a common belief, that if a house was erected by a squatter and his friends on waste ground overnight, then they had the right of undisturbed possession. The problems caused by the large number of illegally erected cottages, on common land, was explicitly recognised by an act known as Erection of Cottages Act 1588 (31 Eliz c. 7, long title "An Act against the erecting and maintaining of Cottages").

The act

The act passed into law on 8 March 1589. Exemption from the Act could be obtained by petition to the Quarter Sessions on grounds of poverty, provided the permission of the manorial lord was given. Lodgers and the subdivision of houses were not allowed. This was qualified by an act passed in 1601 entitled Act for the Relief of the Poor 1601 which gave churchwardens and overseers authority to build cottages on ‘waste and common’ for the use of the poor, with permission of the manorial lord:

The Erection of Cottages Act 1775
The act was repealed by the Erection of Cottages Act 1775 (15 Geo. III c. 32) The principal reasons for the repeal were in the preamble, which stated that the 1588 act had made it difficult for poor people to find 'habitation' and also that it may have caused a reduction in the population.

Notes

References
 
 
 
 
 

1588 in England
Acts of the Parliament of England (1485–1603)
1588 in law
Housing legislation in the United Kingdom